Mark Kendrick may refer to:

Mark Kendrick, character in the 1954 film The House Across the Lake
Mark Kendrick, instrument builder, used by Masami Shiratama